Binningen may refer to:

 Binningen, Switzerland
 Binningen, Rhineland-Palatinate
 Bining, Lorraine, France